The Chief Royal Engineer (CRE) is the official head of the Corps of Royal Engineers of the British Army.

Origin and development
Before the English Restoration a Chief Engineer was a pay grade and not defined. In 1660 King Charles II appointed Sir Charles Lloyd, who had served in the English Civil War, as head of a new department of engineers. The position was confirmed in a Royal Warrant (26 May 1716), which also authorised the formation of the Corps of Engineers.

When in 1802, Sir William Green, 1st Baronet retired, the office was abolished and Robert Morse became the newly created Inspector-General of Fortifications and of Royal Engineers (IGF). Until 1855 the Inspector-General was attached to the Board of Ordnance and then was subordinate directly to the Commander-in-Chief.

In 1862 the office was extended to Inspector-General of Engineers and Director of Work, keeping the affiliation in the former function while being now responsible to the Secretary of State for War in the latter. On the resignation of Edward Frome in 1869, both offices were separated for one year. The Director of Works was dropped in 1895 and the office was renamed to Inspector-General of Fortifications. It was again abolished in 1904 and replaced by the Director of Fortifications and Works.

Modern times
In 1936 the post of Chief Royal Engineer was recreated and Sir Bindon Blood was appointed by King George V. Sir Bindon was commissioned into the Royal Engineers in 1860 and had a distinguished active career until he retired in 1907 aged 65. He was thus 94 years old when appointed Chief Royal Engineer. He resigned in 1940 and died a month later aged 97.

From 1941 until 2012 the professional head of the Corps was the Engineer-in-Chief (Army) (EinC(A)) who as 'Director of Royal Engineers', acted as the engineer advisor to the Chief of the General Staff (CGS) as well as to the Royal Navy, the Royal Air Force and other government ministries on matters of military engineering on behalf of the CGS. This post was disestablished following the Strategic Defence and Security Review and responsibility for the EinC's duties split between the Commandant Royal School of Military Engineering (heritage and training), Commander 8 Engineer Brigade (force generation matters) and the Corps Colonel RE (manning matters and first point of contact with external agencies).

The Chief Royal Engineer is head of the Corps of Royal Engineers and invariably a distinguished officer of the Corps; his tenure in the post is normally for a period of five years. He is responsible for seeing that the Corps' traditions and customs are preserved and the continuity of important matters of Corps policy. He keeps the Colonel-in-Chief informed on Corps matters and maintains contact with engineer units in the Commonwealth. He will have previously served as a Colonel Commandant and will continue to fill one of the vacancies.

Chief Royal Engineers, 1660–1802
1660–1661: Sir Charles Lloyd
Apr – Dec 1661: Sir Bernard de Gomme
1661–1685: Sir Godfrey Lloyd
1685–1702: Sir Martin Beckman
vacant for nine years
1711–1714: Michael Richards
1714–1742: John Armstrong
1742–1751: Thomas Lascelles
vacant for six years
1757–1781: William Skinner
1781–1786: James Bramham
1786–1802: Sir William Green, 1st Bt

Inspector-Generals of Fortifications, 1802–1862
1802–1811: Robert Morse
1811–1830: Gother Mann
1830–1832: Sir Alexander Bryce
1832–1834: Robert Pilkington
1834–1845: Sir Frederick Mulcaster
1845–1862: John Fox Burgoyne

Inspector-Generals of Engineers and Directors of Work, 1862–1869
1862–1868: Sir John Burgoyne, 1st Bt
1868–1869: Edward Frome

Inspector-Generals of Engineers, 1869–1870
1869–1870: Sir John William Gordon

Inspector-Generals of Fortifications and Directors of Work, 1870–1895
1870–1875: Sir Frederick Chapman
1875–1880: Sir Lintorn Simmons
1880–1882: Thomas Lionel John Gallwey
1882–1886: Sir Andrew Clarke
1886–1895: Lothian Nicholson
1891–1895: Sir Robert Grant

Inspector-Generals of Fortifications, 1895–1904
1895–1898: Sir Robert Grant
1898–1903: Sir Richard Harrison
1903–1904: William Terence Shone

Directors of Fortifications and Works, 1904–1936
1904–1908: Richard Mathews Ruck
1908–1911: Frederick Rainsford-Hannay
1911–1918: George Kenneth Scott-Moncrieff
1918–1920: Philip Geoffrey Twining
1920–1924: Sir William Andrew Liddell
1924–1927: Henry Fleetwood Thuillier
1927–1936: Philip Gordon Grant

Chief Royal Engineers, 1936–present
1936–1940: Sir Bindon Blood
1940–1946: Sir Ronald Charles
1946–1951: Sir Guy Williams
1951–1958: Sir Edwin Morris
1958–1961: Sir Kenneth Crawford
1961–1967: Sir Frank Simpson 	 
1967–1972: Sir Charles Jones
1972–1977: Sir Charles Richardson	  	 
1977–1983: Sir David Willison	 
1983–1987: Sir Hugh Beach
1987–1993: Sir George Cooper
1993–1999: Sir John Stibbon
1999–2004: Sir Scott Grant
2004–2009: Sir Kevin O'Donoghue
2009–2013: Sir Peter Wall
2013–2018: Sir Mark Mans
2018–present: Sir Tyrone Urch

Notes

References

External links
Royal Engineers Museum

Royal Engineers
Senior appointments of the British Army
1660 establishments in England